Problepsis herbuloti is a moth of the family Geometridae. It is found in Madagascar.

References

Moths described in 1968
Scopulini
Moths of Madagascar